The 1974 Miami Toros season was the second season of the team, and the club's eighth season in professional soccer.  This year, the team earned first place in the Eastern Division.  They advanced through the North American Soccer League playoffs to the NASL Final, before losing on penalty kicks to the Los Angeles Aztecs.

Background

Review

Competitions

NASL regular season

W = Wins, L = Losses, T= PK Shootout Wins, GF = Goals For, GA = Goals Against, PT= point system

6 points for a win,
3 points for a tie,
0 points for a loss,
1 point for each goal scored up to three per game.

Results summaries

Results by round

Match reports

NASL Playoffs

Semifinals

NASL Final 1974

Bracket

Match reports

Statistics

Transfers

See also 
1974 Miami Toros

References 

1974
Miami
Miami Toros
Miami